Dumisani Kelvin Meslane (born 11 May 1985) is a South African rugby union player who last played for the  in the Currie Cup and in the Rugby Challenge. His regular position is flanker.

Career

Youth

Senior career

References

1985 births
Living people
Rugby union players from Port Elizabeth
Xhosa people
South African rugby union players
Border Bulldogs players
SWD Eagles players
Rugby union flankers